HMS Berkeley Castle was a  of the United Kingdom's Royal Navy. Built and commissioned in 1943, she escorted convoys from 1944 to 1945. She later served as an air-sea rescue ship until being placed in reserve. Damaged beyond repair in the North Sea flood of 1953 while at a dry dock in Sheerness, she was scrapped a few years later. She was named after Berkeley Castle in Gloucestershire.

Design
The s were an improved and enlarged derivative of the earlier s, which was intended to be built by shipyards that could not build the larger and more capable frigates. The greater length of the Castles gave made them better seaboats than the Flowers, which were not originally designed for ocean escort work. Large numbers (96 in total) were ordered in late 1942 and early 1943 from shipyards in the United Kingdom and Canada, but Allied successes in the Battle of the Atlantic meant that the requirement for escorts was reduced, and many ships (including all the Canadian ones) were cancelled.

Displacement was about  standard and  full load.

The ships had a main gun armament of a single QF 4-inch Mk XIX dual-purpose gun, backed up by two twin and two single Oerlikon 20 mm cannon. Anti-submarine armament consisted of a single triple-barrelled Squid anti-submarine mortar with 81 depth charges backed up by two depth charge throwers and a single depth charge rail, with 15 depth charges carried. Type 272 or Type 277 surface search radar was fitted, as was high-frequency direction finding (HF/DF) gear. The ships' sonar outfit was Type 145 and Type 147B.

Service
Berkeley Castle was one of five Castle-class corvettes ordered on 2 February 1943. She was laid down at the Barclay Curle shipyard in Glasgow on 23 April 1943, launched on 19 August and commissioned on 18 November 1943. After working up, Berkeley Castle joined the 15th Escort Group, escorting her first convoy in late January 1944. On 1 March 1944, she joined the 40th Escort Group, operating on the Gibraltar convoy route, and on 23 May transferred to the B5 Escort Group, with the same duties. On 10 September 1944, the B5 Escort Group was renamed the 31st Escort Group, with Berkeley Castle as Senior Officer's ship, and returned to UK coastal Waters, continuing to the end of the war in Europe.

Berkeley Castle was then employed as an air-sea rescue ship until mid 1946, when she was placed in reserve at Harwich. She was refitted at London in 1949, before returning to reserve. On the night of 31 January/1 February 1953, Berkeley Castle was in dry dock at the naval dockyard at Sheerness, Kent when Sheerness was struck by the North Sea flood of 1953. The tidal surge overtopped the dock gates, flooding the dry dock and causing Berkeley Castle to float off her blocks and capsize. She was refloated, but damage was such that she was beyond economic repair and was not repaired. She was placed on the disposal list in 1955. She arrived at Thos. W. Ward's breaking yard in Grays, Essex,  on 29 February 1956 for scrapping.

Notes

References

Publications
 
 .
 
 
 
 
 
 

 

Castle-class corvettes
1943 ships
Maritime incidents in 1953